High jinks was a popular 18th-century drinking game in Scotland. The game involved throwing a die, and if the caster got a bad score, they had to choose between drinking more alcohol or performing an undignified task.

The term "high jinks" is now commonly used to refer to any prank or frolic.

References

Drinking games